Veronika Khardina (born 29 August 1996) is a Kazakhstani handball player for Kaysar Club and the Kazakhstani national team.

She competed at the 2015 World Women's Handball Championship in Denmark.

References

1996 births
Living people
Kazakhstani female handball players
Handball players at the 2018 Asian Games
Asian Games competitors for Kazakhstan
20th-century Kazakhstani women
21st-century Kazakhstani women